The 32nd Robert Awards ceremony was held on 1 February 2015 in Tivoli Hotel & Congress Centre in Copenhagen, Denmark. Organized by the Danish Film Academy, the awards honoured the best in Danish and foreign film of 2014.

Honorees

Best Danish Film 
 Nymphomaniac Director's Cut – Lars von Trier

Best Children's Film 
 Antboy: Revenge of the Red Fury – Ask Hasselbalch

Best Director 
 Lars von Trier – Nymphomaniac Director's Cut

Best Screenplay 
 Lars von Trier – Nymphomaniac Director's Cut (Best original screenplay)
 Lærke Sanderhoff & Søren Balle – The Sunfish (Best adapted script)

Best Actor in a Leading Role 
 Henrik Birch – The Sunfish

Best Actress in a Leading Role 
 Bodil Jørgensen – All Inclusive

Best Actor in a Supporting Role 
 Fares Fares – The Absent One (2014 film)

Best Actress in a Supporting Role 
 Danica Curcic – Silent Heart

Best Production Design 
 Sabine Hviid – When Animals Dream

Best Cinematography 
 Manuel Alberto Claro – Nymphomaniac Director's Cut

Best Costume Design 
 Manon Rasmussen – Nymphomaniac Director's Cut

Best Makeup 
 Louise Hauberg Lohmann, Thomas Foldberg & Morten Jacobsen – When Animals Dream

Best Editing 
 Molly Malene Stensgaard & Morten Højbjerg – Nymphomaniac Director's Cut

Best Sound Design 
 Kristian Eidnes Andersen – Nymphomaniac Director's Cut

Best Score 
 Tina Dickow & Marie Fisker – En du elsker

Visual Effects 
 Peter Hjorth – Nymphomaniac Director's Cut

Best Short Fiction/Animation 
 Helium – Anders Walter

Best Long Fiction/Animation 
 Lulu – Caroline Sascha Cogez

Best Documentary Short 
 Mig og min far – Hvem fanden gider klappe? – Kathrine Ravn Kruse

Best Documentary Feature 
 The Look of Silence – Joshua Oppenheimer

Best Short Television Series 
 Tidsrejsen – Kaspar Munk

Best Danish Television Series 
 The Legacy – Pernilla August

Best Actress in a Leading Television Role 
 Trine Dyrholm – The Legacy

Best Actor in a Leading Television Role 
 Carsten Bjørnlund – The Legacy

Best Actress in a Supporting Television Role 
 Lene Maria Christensen – The Legacy

Best Actor in a Supporting Television Role 
 Mikkel Boe Følsgaard – The Legacy

Best American Film 
 Boyhood – Richard Linklater

Best Non-American Film 
 Force Majeure – Ruben Östlund

Honorary Award 
 Christel Hammer

The Ib Award 
 Sigrid Dyekjær

Audience Award 
 The Absent One (2014 film) – as "Blockbuster Publikumsprisen"

See also 

 2015 Bodil Awards

References

External links 
  
 32nd Robert Awards at IMDb

2014 film awards
Robert Awards ceremonies
2015 in Copenhagen
February 2015 events in Europe